In number theory, Lucas's theorem expresses the remainder of division of the binomial coefficient  by a prime number p in terms of the base p expansions of the integers m and n.

Lucas's theorem first appeared in 1878 in papers by Édouard Lucas.

Statement 
For non-negative integers m and n and a prime p, the following congruence relation holds:

where

and

are the base p expansions of m and n respectively.  This uses the convention that  if m < n.

 Proofs

There are several ways to prove Lucas's theorem.

Consequences 
 A binomial coefficient  is divisible by a prime p if and only if at least one of the base p digits of n is greater than the corresponding digit of m.
 In particular,  is odd if and only if the binary digits (bits) in the binary expansion of n are a subset of the bits of m.

Variations and generalizations 

 Kummer's theorem asserts that the largest integer k such that pk divides the binomial coefficient  (or in other words, the valuation of the binomial coefficient  with respect to the prime p) is equal to the number of carries that occur when n and m − n are added in the base p.

 Generalizations of Lucas's theorem to the case of p being a prime power are given by Davis and Webb (1990) and Granville (1997).

 The q-Lucas theorem is a generalization for the q-binomial coefficients, first proved by J. Désarménien.

References

External links

Articles containing proofs
Theorems about prime numbers